The Ekalluk River (variations: Ekalluktok, Ekaluktuuk, Ekaluk) is a river in the Kitikmeot Region, Nunavut, Canada. It is located in central through southeastern Victoria Island. Its source is Tahiryuaq (Ferguson Lake), and it flows west to Wellington Bay and east to Albert Edward Bay. Nearby lakes include Keyhole Lake, Kitigaq, and Surrey Lake. The closest community is Cambridge Bay.

The people of the Ekalluk River area are called Ekalluktogmiut, a geographically defined Copper Inuit subgroup.

Iqaluktuuq

The short span of the Ekalluk River that flows west from Tahiryuaq into eastern Wellington Bay is named Iqaluktuuq (Inuinnaqtun, meaning "place of big fish"). Having been inhabited for the last 4,000 years by Tuniit and Inuit, it is an important Nunavut archaeological area. The Iqaluktuuq is a source of char fishing and caribou hunting for local residents.

The people of Iqaluktuuq are called Iqaluktuurmiut.

See also
List of rivers of Nunavut

References

 Ekalluk River at Atlas of Canada

Rivers of Kitikmeot Region
Victoria Island (Canada)
Former populated places in the Kitikmeot Region